The TVS School (formerly TVS Matriculation Higher Secondary School) was established in 1972 with 40 students. It provides education to the inhabitants of Madurai and its surroundings in Tamil Nadu, India. It is governed by a council named Lakshmi Vidya Sangham, constituted by the descendants of the founder of the TVS Group, T. V. Sundaram Iyengar. The school has a strength of about 4,907 pupils, 201 teaching staff and additional parent tutors. The school functions in two shifts for all classes from the lower kindergarten to Std XII. There is also a separate nursery school near the main campus. It is one of the top schools of madurai.

History
Lakshmi Vidya Sangham is a registered society under the Societies Registration Act XXI of 1860 and amended by Madras Act XXXIV of 1954 on 6 June, 1964. It was named after Srimathi. Lakshmi Ammal, wife of T. V. Sundaram Iyengar. It is located in Lakshmi Road, T V S Nagar, Madurai - 625003.

TVS Matriculation Higher Secondary School, originally known as TVS Lakshmi Matriculation Higher Secondary School, was founded by LVS. The school was registered with just 40 students in 1972 and today has over 4,700 students. Shri. N. Sundram was the first correspondent, followed in 1968 by Shri. K. Surya Narayanan.

Committee members

The school day
The School operates in two shifts, commonly called the Forenoon Shift (FN) and the Afternoon Shift (AN).The Forenoon Shift works between 7:00 am and 12:25 pm. The Afternoon Shift works between 12:35pm and 6:00 PM. Students from the interior of the Madurai town and the other parts of the city, past the Vaigai River are usually enrolled in this shift, largely to avoid the peak hour traffic in the evening. Pupils on this shift make the greatest use of the bus fleet; almost 95% of the fleet is used for transporting FN shift students.
 The Students residing near the School are usually enrolled in this shift, with only 4 areas served by buses.

The School has a large bus bay for parking and boarding the buses. The Bus Service is managed by a separate committee and the buses are under contract from the Senthamarai Agency.

Campus
The campus comprises:
 a newly built block with the library on the ground floor and science labs above.
 an audiovisual room and four e-pathshalas, connections to a nationwide online system for the distribution of textbooks, audio, video, periodicals and a variety of other print and non-print materials.
 an office block housing the Principal's cabin, Director's cabin, the V.P.'s cabin and the office.
 two two-storey wings of classrooms near the office. The south wing has the classrooms for standards IX and X and the north wing for standards XI and XII. (now modified)
 the craft hall building, with the ground floor craft hall used to host many functions, assemblies and student meetings. The first floor has the exam halls which are used to conduct the daily tests for classes 10 and 12, monthly tests for classes 9 and 11.
 a block opposite to the craft hall has three floors of classrooms and staffrooms.
 the New Building houses the middle-level classes. ( now modified )
 the open air auditorium is used for hosting large functions such as Annual Day, LOSA and other events like "Felicitating the Toppers". It is also used as a gymnasium for the activity classes.

Campus Gallery

Curriculum
The curriculum offered was changed from the CBSE to the Matriculation syllabus to fulfil the expectations of the parents. The school follows the Matriculation Syllabus until standard X and the State Board syllabus for standard XII. Computers are used as a teaching tool throughout the school. The Montessori system is in place at the preschool education and kindergarten levels. The SBC (Skill Based Curriculum) developed by the TVS faculty is followed by students in classes I to VIII using the Matriculation books.

The school employs the services of Creya, a company offering an experiential learning program for students of grades VI to VIII. The program encourages analytical thinking, problem solving, creativity, information fluency, communication and collaboration. It is a hands-on interdisciplinary program. Creya provides the curriculum, coaches and the manipulative resources as well as professional development for teachers and learning environment design. Creya Learning provides a 30-hour program for each grade through projects which are a blend of STEM subjects (Science, technology, engineering, and mathematics), digital media & arts, as well as "life and leadership skills". The program is delivered as part of the regular schedule spread through the academic year. The Creya program is aligned to CBSE/ICSE curriculum and to international standards like ITEEA.

Assessment:

Extracurricular activities
The School has a range of extra curricular activities including arts and crafts, association football, badminton, classical dance, clay modelling, gymnastics, music, roller skating, school band, Taekwondo, theatre arts, yoga, and sports such as basketball, tennis, and volleyball. The school has quizzing culture and has produced a bunch of talented quizzers topping many The Hindu Young World Quizzes at District and National levels.
The school is known for Quality Circle, where each year the students present in National & International Convention.

The Physical Education Department
Outdoor and indoor games such as cricket are encouraged. The school has courts for basketball, badminton, ball badminton, throw ball and volleyball on the playground. There are also separate courts including a tennis Court and two ball badminton courts which can be converted from the roller skating ground. There is also a footballcumhockey field, although field hockey has not been played at the school since 2005.

Skating Ground
The roller skating ground was the first of its kind in Madurai District  and is also known as the Cemented Quadrangle. The skating ground is large, but the rink itself is small. The skating ground can also be used as ball badminton courts. Many students participate in the skating classes which are conducted every Sunday. In addition students of classes 48 also attend the classes during school hours.

Sporting events
The school hosts various sporting events throughout the year, including the LVS Sports Meet, LOSA competitions, Lakshmi Trophy and Intra-Murals. The LVS Sports Meet is a sporting event in which all the schools of the Lakshmi Vidya Sangham participate. The LVS hosts various sporting displays from the primary to higher levels. The Intra Murals are the competitions played between the different houses of standards VII and VIII, IX and X, XI and XII.

Committees
The school has several committees functioning under the school management for the better management of the school including the Discipline and Examination Committees.

Student Council
The Student council is a body run by the students for the welfare and improvement of the student community in the school. The council is headed by the heads and viceheads of the Shifts. The Student Council consists of the prefects of each class from classes 812. Each class has two prefects, a boy and a girl. There are also monitors who are responsible for things like electricity conservation, black board maintenance and furniture maintenance. These monitors come under the Prefects, but are not included in the hierarchy of the student council. They frame and implement rules and principles for their own community. The viceheads are nominated when they enter HSC 1st Year and succeed as heads when they enter HSC 2nd Year.

A 'Quality Circle', with teams of teachers and students, works on unearthing solutions to problems and identifying scope for further improvement. The QC teams have presented their case study at National & International conventions of QCFI and have won numerous awards.

Teacher Training Centre
The school operates a full-time Teacher Training Centre called LTTC (Lakshmi Teacher Training Centre). Its purpose is to organize training sessions for the teachers of the school. Methodology courses and workshops are organised throughout the year on areas such as attitudes, values, communication skills and reading habits.

LOSA
LOSA (Lakshmi Old Students Association) is the school's alumni association. It has taken the role of conducting cultural and sports competitions amongst schools from the city and around the state. The cultural festival organized by LOSA is open to schools all across the state. A marathon was held to create social awareness on "female infanticide" at the festival in July 2010. The association organizes regular reunions for former pupils from all over the globe.

External links

Madurai School TN Nic

References 

High schools and secondary schools in Tamil Nadu
Schools in Madurai